Coffee production in Bolivia has had a long history in the country.

History
19th century
Bolivia did not export as much coffee as the neighboring countries. The best coffee produced Yungas, which rivals Cafe mocha. The departments of La Paz, Cochabamba, Santa Cruz, and El Beni are the principal areas which produced coffee; the most notable areas were the districts of Yungas, Caupalicam, Espiritu Santo, and Valle Grande. There was a time in which the Yungas coffee had a great demand, especially so in Europe. This Asiatic plant is so well acclimatized in Yungas that it grows spontaneously, for each grain which falls on the ground becomes a tree. In 1885, the production of coffee was 2,400,000 pounds a year. By 1900, at La Paz, a machine was installed to roast and grind coffee, selling it in home-made tins. 

Early 20th century
Production in 1908 was 1,500,000 pounds. About 150,000 pounds were exported annually; most of it is consigned to Chile.

See also

References
 This article includes text incorporated from Pan American Union's "Coffee: extensive information and statistics" (1902), a publication now in the public domain.
 This article includes text incorporated from H.C. Graham's "Coffee: Production, trade, and consumption by countries" (1912), a publication now in the public domain.

Agriculture in Bolivia
Bolivia